Eliane Rosa Sampaio (born ) is a Brazilian individual rhythmic gymnast. She represents her nation at international competitions. She competed at world championships, including at the 2009, 2010, 2011 and 2014  World Rhythmic Gymnastics Championships.

In 2013, Eliane Sampaio and the other members of the Brazilian group — Beatriz Pomini, Bianca Mendonça, Debora Falda, Francielly Pereira and Gabrielle Silva — earned the bronze medal on the 3 balls + 2 ribbons routine at the Minsk stage of the 2013 Rhythmic Gymnastics World Cup Series. This was not only Brazil's but also Latin America's first medal at the Rhythmic Gymnastics World Cup series, and only the second time a country from the Americas earned a medal at the World Cup, after Canada's Mary Fuzesi earned the bronze medal on ribbon at the 1990 FIG World Cup Final.

References

1992 births
Living people
Brazilian rhythmic gymnasts
Place of birth missing (living people)
Gymnasts at the 2011 Pan American Games
Pan American Games medalists in gymnastics
Pan American Games gold medalists for Brazil
South American Games gold medalists for Brazil
South American Games silver medalists for Brazil
South American Games medalists in gymnastics
Competitors at the 2010 South American Games
Medalists at the 2011 Pan American Games
21st-century Brazilian women